= Klaus Klein =

German biologist

Klaus Klein, Dr.rer.nat. is Professor of Biology and of Health Education and Director of the Health Education Research Unit at the University of Cologne in Cologne, Germany. He was the first faculty member at any European university to hold the title of professor of health education.
